Bedfordshire Hospitals NHS Foundation Trust is an NHS foundation trust formed on 1 April 2020. It runs Bedford Hospital and Luton and Dunstable University Hospital.

History 
The trust was formed on 1 April 2020 by the acquisition of Bedford Hospital NHS Trust by Luton and Dunstable University Hospital NHS Foundation Trust.

References

External links 
 
 Inspection reports from the Care Quality Commission

NHS foundation trusts